Krista Eileen Wiegand (born February 19, 1971) is an American political scientist. She is an full professor of Political Science and Director of the Global Security Program at the Howard H. Baker Jr. Center for Public Policy at the University of Tennessee. She is also the Co-Editor-in-Chief of the journal International Studies Quarterly until the end of 2023.

Early life and education
Wiegand was born on February 19, 1971, in Miami, Florida. She earned her Bachelor of Arts degree and first Master's degree from the American University School of International Service. From there, she enrolled at Duke University for her second master's degree and PhD.

After graduating from the American University School of International Service, Wiegand traveled to Beirut with her Lebanese-American friends where she learned about their Lebanese Civil War. As a result, she chose to write her master's thesis on this topic. The following summer, she returned to Lebanon to continue her research but her friends were detained by Hezbollah for "helping an American." She stated that she was "grilled for several hours about America’s involvement with Israel." Afterward, she was recruited by the CIA for a job in covert operations, which she declined.

Career
Wiegand is a specialist in international relations, focusing on international and civil conflict and conflict resolution. She is an expert on territorial and maritime disputes, particularly the disputes in the South China Sea, East China Sea, and the Sea of Japan, and a specialist in maritime international law.

Wiegand joined the faculty at Georgia Southern University (GSU) in 2005 as an assistant professor in their Department of Political Science and Director of their Honors Program in Political Science. She stayed at GSU for nine years before accepting a position at the University of Tennessee (UT).

Upon joining the faculty at UT, Wiegand became an associate professor of Political Science and Director of the Global Security Program at the Howard H. Baker Jr. Center for Public Policy. In this capacity, Wiegand directs multiple government-funded grants, conducts policy-relevant research on international conflict, and works with faculty and graduate student fellows. In 2015, Wiegand taught for the Semester at Sea program. In 2017, Wiegand accepted a Fulbright senior scholarship which sent her to the Philippines for research purposes for five months. Two years later, she was appointed the Co-Editor-in-Chief of the journal International Studies Quarterly, flagship journal of the International Studies Association, with Brandon Prins from 2019 until the end of 2023.

Selected publications
The following is a list of selected publications
 Enduring territorial disputes: Strategies of bargaining, coercive diplomacy, and settlement (2011)
 Bombs and Ballots: Governance by Islamic Terrorist and Guerrilla Groups (2010)

Personal life
Wiegand and her husband Michael L. Jordan have one child together.

References

External links

Living people
1971 births
Duke University alumni
American University School of International Service alumni
University of Tennessee faculty
Political science journal editors
Academics from Florida